Francisco Romero (died 16 July 1635) was a Roman Catholic prelate who served as Archbishop (Personal Title) of Vigevano (1621–1635) and Archbishop of Lanciano (1618–1621).

Biography
On 30 September 1607, Francisco Romero was ordained in the Order of the Brothers of the Blessed Virgin Mary of Mount Carmel.
On 14 May 1618, he was appointed by Pope Paul V as Archbishop of Lanciano.
On 20 May 1618, he was consecrated bishop by Giovanni Garzia Mellini, Cardinal-Priest of Santi Quattro Coronati, with Paolo De Curtis, Bishop Emeritus of Isernia, and Giovanni Battista Lancellotti, Bishop of Nola, serving as co-consecrators. 
On 11 January 1621, he was appointed during the papacy of Pope Gregory XV as Archbishop (Personal Title) of Vigevano.
He served as Archbishop of Vigevano until his death on 16 July 1635.

References 

17th-century Italian Roman Catholic archbishops
Year of birth unknown
1635 deaths
Bishops appointed by Pope Paul V
Bishops appointed by Pope Gregory XV
Carmelite bishops